Mduuni Ruins (Swahili Mji wa Kale wa Msuka Mjini) is protected historic site located inside Micheweni District of Pemba North Region in Tanzania. The settlement was established around 1100 CE.

See also
Historic Swahili Settlements
Archaeology of Pemba Island

References

Swahili people
Swahili city-states
Swahili culture
Pemba Island